Küstrin-Kietz station is a railway station in the municipality of Küstrin-Kietz in the Märkisch-Oderland district of Brandenburg, Germany. It is served by trains operated by the privately owned Niederbarnimer Eisenbahn between Berlin-Ostkreuz and Kostrzyn nad Odrą (Poland), via Müncheberg (Mark) and Werbig (line RB 26, the Oderlandbahn).

References

1877 establishments in Prussia
Buildings and structures in Märkisch-Oderland
Railway stations in Brandenburg
Railway stations in Germany opened in 1877